Cool Yule is a first holiday album by American singer Bette Midler. It was released on October 10, 2006, through Columbia Records. The album features many standard Christmas tunes as well as a reworking edition of her Grammy-winning hit "From a Distance". In 2008, Cool Yule was nominated for a Grammy Award in the Best Traditional Pop Vocal Album category.

Critical reception

AllMusic editor Marisa Brown found that "the Divine Miss M shows off her stuff (including a very able backing band/orchestra) on all the tracks [...] and sounds good the whole time. Because she doesn't add much to the songs that hasn't already been done before, Cool Yule may not replace anyone's [duet partner] Johnny Mathis holiday albums yet, but it's still a pretty strong collection of well-done Christmas standards from a well-known and popular artist."

Chart performance
Cool Yule failed to chart upon its October 10, 2006 release. It was not until November 25, 2006, the album made its debut on the US Billboard 200. It peaked in the week of December 6, 2006, rising from number 35 to number 33 on sales of 47,000 copies. By July 2007, Cool Yule had sold 271,000 copies in United States according to Nielsen Soundscan.

Track listing
All tracks produced by Robbie Buchanan.

Notes
 "I Heard the Bells on Christmas Day" served as a bonus track on CD albums released at Target.

Personnel

Christopher Autopchuk – art direction
Rick Babtist – trumpet
William Baker – copyist
Russell Bartmus – copyist
Leanne Becknell – woodwind
Steve Becknell – French horn
Tom Bender – mixing assistant
Gordon Berg – copyist
Wayne Bergeron – trumpet
Charles Bisharat – violin
David Blumberg – conductor, orchestral arrangements, copyist
Chandler Bridges – engineer
Robbie Buchanan – piano, arranger, conductor, keyboards, producer, orchestration, orchestral arrangements, track arrangement
Caroline Campbell – violin
Darius Campo – violin
Dave Carpenter – upright bass
Lily Chen – violin
Paul Cohen – cello
Vinnie Colaiuta – drums
Dennis Collins – background vocals
Larry Corbett – cello
Rose Corrigan – woodwind
Datz Pyle, Debbi – contractor
Brian Dembow – viola
Joel Derouin – violin
Andrew Duckles – viola
Bruce Dukov – concert master
Katharine Edmonds – copyist
Bill Edwards – copyist
Johnson Enos – background vocals, vocal arrangement
Tabitha Fair – background vocals
Alma Fernandez – viola
Gary Foster – woodwind
Matt Funes – viola
Steve Genewick – digital editing
Mark Graham – copyist
Alan Grunfeld – violin
Mick Guzauski – mixing
Al Hershberger – violin
Dan Higgins – woodwind
Sean Holt – background vocals
Stephen Holtman – trombone
Greg Huckins – woodwind
Alexander Iles – trombone
Bob Jackson – mastering assistant
Sharon Jerry-Collins – background vocals
Bashiri Johnson – percussion
JoAnn Kane – copyist
Ana Landauer – violin
Jay Landers – liner notes, executive producer
Natalie Leggett – violin
Gayle Levant – harp
Bill Liston – woodwind
Dane Little – cello
Doug Livingston – steel guitar 
Bob Ludwig – mastering
Warren Luening – trumpet
Larry Lunetta – trumpet
Barry Manilow – producer
Arif Mardin – orchestral arrangements
Andy Martin – trombone
Liane Mautner – violin
Joe Meyer – French horn
Jaclyn Morse – production coordination
Helen Nightengale – violin
Robin Olson – violin
Michael O'Neill – photography
Charles Paakkari – assistant engineer
Sid Page – violin
Alyssa Park – violin
Searmi Park – violin
Sara Parkins – violin
Dean Parks – guitar
Danny Perito – copyist
Victor Pesavento – copyist
Joel Peskin – woodwind
Bill Reichenbach Jr. – trombone
John A. Reynolds – French horn
Eric Rigler – Uilleann pipes, Irish whistle
Dennis Rivadeneira – mixing assistant
William Ross – arranger, conductor, orchestration, orchestral arrangements, track arrangement
Aaron J. Sala – background vocals, vocal arrangement
Chris Soper – assistant engineer
Ken Stacey – background vocals
Tereza Stanislav – violin
Beverley Staunton – background vocals
Bette Sussman – background vocals, associate producer, vocal arrangement, track arrangement
Phil Teele – trombone
Fonzi Thornton – background vocals
Cecilia Tsan – cello
Jonathan Tunick – arranger, conductor, orchestration
Karen Van Sant – viola
Josephina Vergara – violin
Shalini Vijayan – violin
Windy Wagner – background vocals
Randy Waldman – Piano, keyboards
Helen Barbara Werling – copyist
Patrick Williams – arranger, conductor, orchestration, vocal arrangement, orchestral arrangements, track arrangement
Frank Wolf – track engineer
Terry Woodson – librarian, copyist
Phil Yao – French horn
Gina Zimmitti – contractor

Charts

References

Bette Midler albums
2006 Christmas albums
Christmas albums by American artists
Pop Christmas albums
Columbia Records Christmas albums
Swing Christmas albums
Jazz albums by American artists